Decades is a 2017 double concept album by David Palfreyman and Nicholas Pegg, who co-produced it with Ian Caple.

The album features a cast of notable actors, singers and musicians, including David Warner, Richard Coyle, Jacqueline Pearce, Jan Ravens, Simon Greenall, Edward Holtom, Sarah Jane Morris, Cassidy Janson, Mitch Benn, David Palfreyman, Jessica Lee Morgan, Ian Shaw, Gary Barnacle, Greg Hart, Terry Edwards and Martyn Barker.

Decades is divided into four 'Acts' (corresponding to the four sides of the double vinyl format), and features 20 songs written by Palfreyman, alternating with a linking dramatic narrative written by Pegg. The narrative explores the shifting memories of the album's central character, Kelver Leash, who is played at different stages of his life by Warner, Coyle and Holtom.

Recording 

The music tracks on Decades were recorded at Yellow Fish Studios in Sussex between spring 2014 and summer 2016. The dialogue sequences were recorded at The Moat Studios, London, in January 2016.

Release and reception 

Decades was released on 28 July 2017. Critical reaction was favourable: Record Collector'''s Andy Rawll praised the "outstanding performances" and described the album as "an ambitious, thought-provoking contemporary musical drama about the cycle of life". Writing in Prog, Chris Roberts considered the album "a true progressive rock curio ... a meditation on time and memory, its ambition is simply colossal."  The Spill Magazine hailed Decades as "an epic album ... remarkably brave and certainly brilliant", while We Are Cult described it as "a compelling listen" and "a shameless embrace of the full glory of what the concept album can do". Progradar considered Decades "an absolute delight from start to finish", and dubbed it "one of the albums of the year".

 Singles and videos 

'We All Fall Down', featuring Sarah Jane Morris on lead vocal, was released as a single on 30 June 2017, a month ahead of the album. The single was accompanied by a video directed by Nicholas Pegg, which was shot on location on Dartmoor and featured Sarah Jane Morris alongside actors David Warner, Richard Coyle and Edward Holtom.

'Dead End Morning', featuring David Palfreyman on lead vocal, was released as the album's second single on 1 September 2017. The video was directed by Tom Saunders and Nicholas Pegg, and again featured actors David Warner, Richard Coyle and Edward Holtom alongside Palfreyman in a computer-animated dystopian cityscape.

‘Hurting, Sinking’, featuring Jessica Lee Morgan on lead vocal, was released as the third Decades single on 8 December 2017. The video, released a week earlier, was directed by Paul Vanezis and featured Jessica Lee Morgan in a candle-lit room full of memorabilia, encountering her younger self in a mirror.

‘Eyes Wide’, featuring Cassidy Janson on lead vocal, was released as the fourth single from Decades on 20 April 2018. The video, directed by Tom Saunders, featured Cassidy Janson performing the song against a CGI backdrop of a train speeding through a surreal landscape, and once again featured cameo appearances by actors David Warner, Richard Coyle and Edward Holtom.

 Television and radio appearances 

In 2018 the Decades band made several live appearances on Vintage TV, beginning with a performance for The Vintage TV Sessions transmitted on 25 January. For this appearance the band was fronted by Jessica Lee Morgan, who sang 'Hurting, Sinking' and 'Faraway Day' from the album. Morgan then included an acoustic version of 'Hurting, Sinking' in her own live set for the same channel's Live With... series, transmitted on 7 March 2018. The following month, the full Decades band returned for another edition of The Vintage TV Sessions shown on 26 April 2018, this time showcasing three of the album's lead singers: the set comprised 'Dead End Morning' sung by David Palfreyman, 'Eyes Wide' sung by Cassidy Janson, and 'Got To Be Seen To Be Believed' sung by Sarah Jane Morris.

Prior to these live appearances, the videos for 'We All Fall Down' and 'Hurting, Sinking' were also premiered on Vintage TV, as part of a 2017 edition of the video jukebox show My Vintage presented by Nicholas Pegg.

On 10 June 2018, David Palfreyman and Cassidy Janson appeared on London Live to discuss Decades and the single 'Eyes Wide'. A week earlier, 'Eyes Wide' was premiered by Elaine Paige on her BBC Radio 2 show Elaine Paige on Sunday.

 Personnel 

 Actors 

David Warner - Kelver Leash
Richard Coyle - Kelver as a younger man
Edward Holtom - Kelver as a boy
Jacqueline Pearce - Linda
Simon Greenall - TV Reporter / Roger Fame / Freddie
Jan Ravens - Jemima / Kelver's Mother / Lady Blue

 Lead vocalists 

David Palfreyman - vocals, guitars
Sarah Jane Morris - vocals
Jessica Lee Morgan - vocals
Ian Shaw - vocals
Cassidy Janson - vocals
Mitch Benn - vocals
Beth Cannon - vocals
Eliza Skelton - vocals

 Other musicians 

Martyn Barker - drums, percussion
Gary Barnacle - saxophone, flute
Jack Birchwood - trumpet
David Clayton - keyboards
Ian Caple - keyboards, programmed percussion
Otis Coulter - backing vocals
Oz Dechaine - bass guitar
Kat Downs - keyboards, backing vocals
Terry Edwards - saxophone, trumpet
John Fordham - saxophone
Rodger Hanna - guitar, bass guitar
Jono Harrison - keyboards, guitar
Greg Hart - guitar, backing vocals
Paul Manzi - backing vocals
Adam Mart - violin
Chris Musto - drums, percussion (for the live Decades band)
Ben Nicholls - harmonium
Eliska Palfreyman - backing vocals
Nicholas Pegg - backing vocals
Steve Rump - drums, percussion
Christian Thomas - bass guitar (for the live Decades'' band)
Mike Thompson - drums, percussion
Pat Watters - guitar

References

External links 

Official 'Decades' website
'We All Fall Down' featuring Sarah Jane Morris (official video) on YouTube
'Dead End Morning' featuring David Palfreyman (official video) on YouTube
'Hurting, Sinking' featuring Jessica Lee Morgan (official video) on YouTube
'Eyes Wide' featuring Cassidy Janson (official video) on YouTube
'Introducing Decades' interview with David Palfreyman and Nicholas Pegg on YouTube
Spill Feature: Decades - A conversation with Nicholas Pegg and David Palfreyman
We Are Cult: The Nicholas Pegg interview

2017 albums
Concept albums